Belemniastis whiteleyi is a moth of the subfamily Arctiinae. It was described by Herbert Druce in 1888. It is found in Guyana and Amazonas.

References

Arctiinae
Moths described in 1888